Leggera is a studio album by Italian singer Mina, released on 17 October 1997 by PDU.

Critical reception
Mario Luzzatto Fegiz of Corriere della Sera noted that it is "a good, diverse, funny, believable disc created to once again demonstrate the virtuoso Mina's capabilities, although it is probably a little less commercial than the previous album Cremona."

Track listing

In the song "Grigio" there is a so-called hidden track "Suona ancora" (Mina's solo version), at the end of which you can hear the door open and a male voice says "Permesso?" (May I?). This voice belongs to Adriano Celentano, and the situation itself is a hint of a joint album Mina Celentano, which will be released in 1998.

Personnel
 Mina – vocals (all tracks)
 Mick Hucknall – vocals (2)
 Le Voci Atroci – vocals (3)
 Danilo Rea – piano, Rhodes piano, Hammond organ
 Massimiliano Pani – electronic keyboard, background vocals
 Alfredo Golino – drums
 Massimo Moriconi – bass
 Umberto Fiorentino – guitar
 Lorenzo Malacrida – percussion
 Giorgio Cocilovo – electric guitar
 Paolo Gianolio – acoustic guitar, electric guitar
 Nicolò Fragile – electronic keyboard
 Gogo Ghidelli – guitar
 Cesare Chiodo – bass
 Massimo Varini – guitar
 Gabriele Comeglio – soprano saxophone
 Giulia Fasolino – background vocals
 Paola Folli – background vocals
 Simonetta Robbiani – background vocals
 Moreno Ferrara – background vocals

Charts

References

External links
 

1997 albums
Mina (Italian singer) albums